Chance is a given name and a surname. The given name is of Middle English origin, meaning "good fortune". There are several variants. The oldest public record of the surname dates to 1310 in Essex. People with the name Chance include:

Given name

 Chance Adams (born 1994), American baseball player
 Chance Bateman (born 1981), Australian rules footballer
 Chance the Rapper (born 1993), American rapper, born  Bennett
 Chance Browne (born 1948), American cartoonist
 Chance Campbell (born 1999), American football player
 Chance Carter (born 2001), Canadian soccer player
 Chance Fry (born 1964), American soccer player
 Chance Mock (born 1981), American football player
 Chance Myers (born 1987), American soccer player
 Chance Perdomo, American-born English actor
 Chance Phelps (1984–2004), United States Marine
 Chance Ruffin (born 1988), American baseball player
 Chance Sanford (born 1972), American baseball player
 Chance Sisco (born 1995), American baseball player
 Chance Thomas, American music composer
 Chance M. Vought (1890–1930), American businessman and aerospace engineer
 Chance Warmack (born 1991), American football player
 Chance Waters (born 1987), Australian rapper, songwriter, record producer
 Thomas Chance Morris, a/k/a Sodapoppin (born 1994), Twitch-streamer

Surname

 Beth Chance (born 1968), American statistician
 Bob Chance (1940–2013), American baseball player
 Britton Chance (1913–2010), American professor and Olympic gold medalist
 Dean Chance (1941-2015), American baseball pitcher
 Edgar Chance (1881–1955), industrialist, ornithologist
 Frank Chance (1877–1924), American baseball player and manager
 Fred Chance, American illustrator
 Greyson Chance (born 1997), American singer
 Hugh Chance (1911–1998), American religious person
 James Chance (born 1953), American new wave musician
 Sir James Timmins Chance (1814–1902), industrialist and baronet
 Jean C. Chance, American journalism professor
 John Barnes Chance (1932–1972), American composer
 Kenneth Chance (1879-1969), industrialist
 Kim Chance, Australian politician
 Matthew Chance, British television journalist
 Michael Chance (born 1955), English countertenor
 Molly Chance, American television producer and actress
 Noel Chance, British racehorse trainer
 Stephen Chance (disambiguation), multiple people
 The Chance Brothers, English glass-makers

Fictional characters

In film 

 Chance the Gardener, aka Chauncey Gardiner, in the novel and film Being There
 Chance, an American Bulldog in the movies Homeward Bound: The Incredible Journey and Homeward Bound 2
 Agent Nina Chance, Secret Service agent in the 1997 film Murder at 1600, played by Diane Lane
 Chance Boudreaux, main character of the film Hard Target, played by Jean-Claude Van Damme
 Richard Chance, United States Secret Service agent with the Treasury Department, main character in 1985 film To Live and Die in L.A. (film)
 Chance Wayne, main character from the Tennessee Williams play Sweet Bird of Youth, portrayed by Paul Newman in the 1962 film adaption
 John T. Chance, in the 1959 film Rio Bravo (film)
 Chance Buckman, main character in the 1968 film Hellfighters (film), played by John Wayne.

In other media 
 Jack T. Chance, DC Comics character
 Christopher Chance, another DC Comics character' who uses the alias Human Target
 Chance "T-Bone" Furlong, a protagonist in the animated series SWAT Kats: The Radical Squadron
 Chance Chancellor, in the soap opera The Young and the Restless

References

English masculine given names